Jianan Pass is a border pass along the Line of Actual Control (LAC) between India and China, in the region of Ladakh and Aksai Chin. It is in the Chang Chenmo region, on the watershed between Kugrang and Galwan river basins. The Changlung river basin is also immediately to the east of the pass. China uses the name "Jianan Daban" for the pass. India does not have a native name, but refers to it as Patrol Point 15 (PP-15) for border security purposes. The term Hot Springs has also been used by Indian media through misapplication of terminology.

In the early 1960s, China began to claim the Galwan river basin to the north of the pass as its own territory. India set up an advance post to the north of the pass in 1962, near the Galwan Valley, which caused an "apogee of tension". During the 1962 war, China attacked the post and eliminated it, enforcing its territorial claims. During the 2020–2022 skirmishes, the area around the pass was again a scene of contest. The standoff was finally resolved in September 2022, with a disengagement formula agreed.

Geography 

South of Galwan Valley and north of Chang Chenmo Valley, the Karakoram range divides into multiple branches. Between the branches lie the Kugrang and Changlung valleys, both running northwest–southeast. The Kugrang river flows southeast within the territory under present Indian control, joining the Chang Chenmo River near Hot Springs (also called Kyam or Kayam). The Changlung river flows in a parallel valley to the northeast in territory under present Chinese control, but eventually joins the Kugrang river near Gogra.

The Kugrang Valley extends further west than the Changlung Valley, interacting with the Galwan river basin to the north. The Jianan Pass lies on the watershed between Kugrang and Galwan basins. It is a relatively low pass, at an elevation of 5350 metres, and the ascent on both the sides is gradual. To the south of Jianan pass lies a 15 km-long tributary of the Kugrang River. To the north of the pass is a small stream, which joins a tributary of Galwan called Shimengou, flowing into the Galwan River 8 km downstream.

History 
The Kugrang Valley was little explored during the British Raj. Survey maps show survey stations having been established near the Chang Chenmo Valley. So the Kugrang Valley was only surveyed from a distance, with the results being quite approximate. The Kugrang valley did form a popular hunting area for British officers vacationing in Ladakh.

Sino-Indian border dispute 

After India became independent in 1947 and China took control of Tibet in 1950, both the countries laid claim to the Aksai Chin plateau. In its 1956 border definition, China claimed Lingzithang Plains up to the campsite of Samzungling in the upper Galwan Valley. The majority of the eastern Karakoram range was left in India, including the Galwan Valley to the west of Samzungling and the entire Changlung valley. (Map 3)

Not recognising Chinese claims to Aksai Chin, India continued to send border patrols in "all directions". A common patrol route was along the Changlung Valley and Samzungling to the northern periphery of Aksai Chin. In 1959, a police party sent to set up police posts in these valleys was confronted by Chinese troops near Kongka La and a serious clash occurred, called the Kongka Pass incident.

After the incident, the two countries engaged in serious negotiations. A summit between the prime ministers Jawaharlal Nehru and Zhou En-lai was held in 1960, where Zhou is believed to have proposed  an "east west swap" of disputed territories. India is believed to have rejected such a barter. Sector-by-sector border discussions were held later in 1960 between the officials of the two countries, where China enlarged its border claims. (See Map 3.) In the vicinity of the Kugrang valley, the Chinese officials declared:

This new "1960 claim line" meant that China laid claim to the majority of the Galwan river basin and the entire Changlung river basin, turning the Jianan Pass into a border pass.

1962 standoff 

In the summer of 1962, sensing that China was trying to advance to its 1960 claim line, India initiated what came to be called the "forward policy", setting up advance posts in the territory between the 1960 and 1956 claim lines. The 1/8 Gorkha Riles battalion was ordered to set up a post in the upper reaches of the Galwan River. Setting out from Phobrang, the 'A' Company of the battalion first established a base at Hot Springs. A platoon of the company then moved towards Galwan in July 1962, after setting up a post near Gogra (then called "nullah junction").

The route followed by the Gorkha platoon is not recorded in Indian military history, but it is known that there were only two routes available to them: through the Changlung Valley or via the Jianan Pass. Since Shamal Lungpa in the Changlung Valley was already occupied by the Chinese forces (Map 3), the Jianan route seems more likely. The post set up by them was in the Shimengou valley, north of the pass, close to the confluence of Shimengou with the Galwan River. China provided the coordinates of the post and described it as "six kilometres inside Chinese territory in the Galwan Valley area".

Despite a seriously threatening posture by the Chinese troops, the post held firm and remained intact until the beginning of the war in October 1962. It was supplied by air. Even though a supply route was available through the Jianan Pass, the Chinese forces surrounded the Gorkha post and did not allow supplies to pass through. In early October, the Gorkha Rifles were due for a turnover, and they were replaced by troops of 5 Jat, again by air. Indian sources claim that additional supporting posts were also set up by the Indian troops. (Map 4)

1962 war 
The Sino-Indian War began in the western sector on 19 October 1962. The Chinese attacked all Indian posts that were beyond their 1960 claim line. The Indian Galwan post was the first to be attacked, and eliminated by the evening of 20 October. The next day, the Chinese shelled the remaining posts. Since there was no tactical need for the supporting posts after the fall of the Galwan post, they were withdrawn to Gogra.

The Line of Actual Control (LAC) resulting from the war remained on the watershed of the Kugrang river.

2010–2015 

After the 1962 war, both India and China left the border alone for about two decades. In the 1980s, both resumed patrolling up to the prevailing border. At many locations along the LAC, there were overlapping claims, and protocols were eventually developed to avoid conflicts. However, at this pass, which China began to call "Jianan Pass" and India the "Patrol Point 15", there were no overlapping claims, but the occupation of the pass itself might have been contested.

Historical satellite imagery shows that, between 2010–2015, both the sides laid motorable roads to the pass. The 2015 image shows a continuous road extending towards both the sides of the pass and a trench dug across it a few metres to the north of the pass along with other smaller trenches in the pass area. (Map 5) This would imply that both sides denied road access to each other for the pass area.

2020–2022 border standoff 
During the wide-ranging China–India border standoff that began in 2020, the Jianan Pass area was again contested. Historical satellite imagery shows that the road in the pass area has been repaved over the earlier trenches. On 5 May 2020, news media reported that clusters of Chinese forces began appearing in the "Gogra–Hot Springs" area. It later became clear that the Jianan Pass was included in this description. 

Over a thousand Chinese soldiers are reported to have crossed the LAC at Jianan Pass and India said to have carried out a "mirror deployment" of its own troops. On 6 June, it was reported that the commanders of the two sides agreed to a "disengagement" at Galwan, Gogra and Hot Springs, but this was not followed through. There was no pull-back from the Gogra–Hot Springs area, whereas, at Galwan, the Chinese soon reinstated their post. This led to a serious clash at Galwan, in which twenty Indian soldiers and at least four Chinese soldiers died.

According to later reports, the majority of the troops at the Jianan Pass were withdrawn by July 2020, but a "small detachment" of about 50 soldiers remained. Near Gogra, the Chinese forces came down 2–4 km from the Line of Actual Control, and set up posts close to Gogra itself, thereby "blockading" the Kugrang Valley and denying India access to the Jianan Pass. It took several months and 10 rounds of talks between the military commanders to agree on the first pull-back in February 2021, at the Pangong Lake. In the 12th round of talks in August 2021, the two sides agreed to disengage at Gogra.

Discussions for disengagement at the Jianan Pass continued. In April 2022, during the visit of Chinese foreign minister Wang Yi to New Delhi, a proposal was apparently made that the Indian troops should move back to the "Karam Singh Post", which is near the mouth of the Kugrang River, at over 30 km distance from the Jianan Pass. India rejected the proposal. Similar proposals are believed to have been made at the commander level talks during the 13–15th rounds, with similar results.

After the 16th round of talks in July 2022, optimistic reports appeared saying "forward movement likely". After a lull of two months, a surprise announcement was made by the Indian External Affairs Ministry in September that the disengagement process had already started on 8 September and would be complete by 12 September. It was stated the LAC in the area would be strictly observed by both the sides and that there would be no unilateral change in the status quo. NDTV published satellite imagery a few days later, confirming that the Chinese PLA had moved their post north of the pass to a location 3 km downstream along the Shimengou river. The LAHDC Councillor from Chushul, Konchok Stanzin, informed the media that the Indian post at the mouth of the Jianan Valley (referred to as "PP 16") was also moved. According to satellite imagery, it was moved two kilometres downstream along the Kugrang River.

While the External Affairs Ministry announcement only mentioned that the LAC would be strictly observed, most media commentators interpreted the withdrawals as creating a "buffer zone". Konchok Stanzin has claimed that the grazing grounds of Ladakhi nomads have now become a "buffer zone".

See also
 Kongka Pass

Notes

References

Bibliography 
 
 
 
 
 
 
 
 
 
 
 
 
 

Chang Chenmo Valley